Melus in Greek mythology is a minor figure, a childhood friend of Adonis, Aphrodite's beloved, who is connected to apples via his metamorphosis into one.

Mythology 
Melus was born on Delos, but moved to Cyprus. When the ruler of Cyprus, Cinyras, saw that Melus was of sound character, he made Melus a companion to his son Adonis. Melus eventually married a woman named Pelia, who was kin to Cinyras and Adonis, and had a son by her, also named Melus. The child was raised inside the sanctuary of Aphrodite. When Adonis was slain by a boar during hunting, Melus was so distraught over his loss that he ended his life by hanging himself from an apple tree, which took his name thereafter. Pelia, not standing the loss of her kin and her husband, took her life in the same way. After Aphrodite's own period of mourning was over, she turned Melus into an apple fruit, and Pelia into a dove. Their son, Melus, was sent back to Delos, where he founded the city Melon. The sheep there also took his name, for he first taught the Delians to shear them and make clothing out of their wool; the Greek  means 'apple' and 'sheep' both. The apple was seen as the most important fruit symbol of Aphrodite, as the emblem of her victory in the beauty contest; in the ancient Greek society, the apple fruit became "the love token par excellence".

See also 

 Side (mythology)
 Peristera (mythology)
 Cycnus of Liguria

References

Bibliography 
 
 
 
 Maurus Servius Honoratus, In Vergilii carmina comentarii. Servii Grammatici qui feruntur in Vergilii carmina commentarii; recensuerunt Georgius Thilo et Hermannus Hagen. Georgius Thilo. Leipzig. B. G. Teubner. 1881. Online version at the Perseus Digital Library.
 Smith, William, A Dictionary of Greek and Roman Biography and Mythology. London. John Murray: printed by Spottiswoode and Co., New-Street Square and Parliament Street, 1873.

Deeds of Aphrodite
Metamorphoses into plants in Greek mythology
Characters in Greek mythology
Cypriot mythology
Family of Adonis
Apples in culture